Below are lists of Japanese football transfers in the J.League divisions J1 League, J2 League and J3 League.

2009–2015 
 List of Japanese football transfers winter 2009–10
 List of Japanese football transfers winter 2010–11
 List of Japanese football transfers winter 2011–12
 List of Japanese football transfers summer 2012
 List of Japanese football transfers winter 2012–13
 List of Japanese football transfers summer 2013
 List of Japanese football transfers winter 2014–15
 List of Japanese football transfers summer 2015

2016 
 List of J1 League transfers winter 2015–16
 List of J2 League transfers winter 2015–16
 List of J3 League transfers winter 2015–16

2017 
 List of J1 League transfers winter 2016–17
 List of J2 League transfers winter 2016–17
 List of J3 League transfers winter 2016–17
 List of Japanese football transfers summer 2017

2018 
 List of J1 League football transfers winter 2017–18
 List of J2 League football transfers winter 2017–18
 List of J3 League football transfers winter 2017–18
 List of J1 League football transfers summer 2018
 List of J2 League football transfers summer 2018
 List of J3 League football transfers summer 2018

2019–22 
 List of J1 League football transfers winter 2018–19
 List of J2 League football transfers winter 2018–19
 List of J3 League football transfers winter 2018–19
 List of J1 League football transfers summer 2019
 List of J2 League football transfers summer 2019
 List of J3 League football transfers summer 2019

2023 
 List of J1 League football transfers 2023
 List of J2 League football transfers 2023
 List of J3 League football transfers 2023
 List of Japan Football League football transfers 2023